The Raduga KSR-5 (NATO reporting name AS-6 Kingfish) was a long-range,  air-launched cruise missile and anti ship missile developed by the Soviet Union. 
It was essentially a scaled down version of the Kh-22 'Kitchen', built to be carried by the less capable Tu-16.

Variants
The Raduga KSR-5 was developed in variants to be deployed as a land attack missile and an anti-ship missile. The missile was designed to be fitted with either a conventional or nuclear warhead.

Operational history
The Raduga KSR-5 was deployed aboard such Soviet aircraft as the Tupolev Tu-16 'Badger' in Tu-16K-26, Tu-16KSR-2-5, and Tu-16KSR-2-5-11 variants, as well as the Tu-22M Backfire.
Post 1991 with the retirement of the Badger, the KSR-5 warstock was converted into supersonic targets.

Operators

Specifications

 Length: 
 Wingspan: 
 Diameter: 
 Launch weight: 
 Speed: 
 Range: 
 Guidance: inertial guidance, optional mid-course update via data link, terminal active radar homing or passive radar homing

References

Bibliography

External links
 Federation of American Scientists page on the KSR-5 missile
 Air Power Australias web page

Weapons of Russia
Cold War anti-ship missiles of the Soviet Union
Nuclear air-to-surface missiles
Nuclear cruise missiles of the Soviet Union
KSR-005
KSR-005
Target drones
MKB Raduga products